Lou West (born December 29, 1953) is an American football coach and former player. He currently serves as the co-defensive coordinator and secondary coach at Wayne State University in Detroit, Michigan. West served as the head football coach at Indiana State University in Terre Haute, Indiana from 2005 to 2007, compiling a record of 1–25.  After his college football playing career at the University of Cincinnati, he was selected by the Pittsburgh Steelers in the 1977 NFL Draft.

Head coaching record

Notes

References

External links
 Wayne State profile

1953 births
Living people
American football defensive backs
Alabama State Hornets football coaches
Arizona Western Matadors football coaches
Arizona Wildcats football coaches
Cincinnati Bearcats football coaches
Cincinnati Bearcats football players
Indiana State Sycamores football coaches
Kent State Golden Flashes coaches
Middle Tennessee Blue Raiders football coaches
Minnesota Golden Gophers football coaches
Rose–Hulman Fightin' Engineers football coaches
Toledo Rockets football coaches
Virginia Tech Hokies football coaches
Wayne State Warriors football coaches
Western Michigan Broncos football coaches
People from Niles, Ohio
Players of American football from Ohio
African-American coaches of American football
African-American players of American football
21st-century African-American people
20th-century African-American sportspeople